Gloucester 2 North and Gloucester 2 South are English rugby union leagues which sits at the tenth level of league rugby union in England for teams primarily based in Gloucestershire as well as some teams from Bristol. Promoted clubs move into Gloucester 1 and since the discontinuation of Gloucester 3 at the end of the 2017–18 season there is currently no relegation.  Up until 2017-18 Gloucester 2 was a single division but has since been split into two regional divisions.

Teams 2021-22

Ahead of the new season Stroud RFC, promoted to South West 1 West as champions of Western Counties North in 2019–20, withdrew from SW1W and instead joined at the bottom of the regional RFU pyramid in Gloucester 2.

North

South

2020–21
Due to the COVID-19 pandemic, the 2020–21 season was cancelled.

Teams 2019–20

North

South

Teams 2018–19

North

South

Teams 2017–18

Teams 2016-17
Bishopston (relegated from Gloucester 1)
Bristol Airplane Company
Broad Plain
Cheltenham Civil Service (promoted from Gloucester 3)
Kingswood
Minchinhampton
Painswick (relegated from Gloucester 1)
Old Colstians
Old Elizabethans (promoted from Gloucester 3)
Ross-on-Wye
Smiths
Westbury-on-Severn

Teams 2015–16

The 2015–16 Gloucester 2 consists of twelve teams; ten from Gloucestershire and Bristol as well as two teams in Herefordshire and Somerset. The season starts on 12 September 2015 and is due to end on 23 April 2016.  Eight of the twelve teams participated in last season's competition. The 2014–15 champions St Brendan's Old Boys and runners up Bishopston were promoted to the Gloucester 1 while Old Elizabethans were relegated to Gloucester 3.

{{Location map+|Bristol|width=300|float=right|caption=Locations of the 2015-16 Gloucester 2 South teams in Bristol|places=

{{location map~|Bristol|lat=51.480309|long=-2.555864|label=Old Colstonians|position=bottom|label_size=80}}
}}

Teams 2014–15
Aretians
Ashley Down Old Boys (relegated from Gloucester 1)Bishopston (relegated from Gloucester 1)Bristol Aeroplane Co.
Broad Plain
Cotham Park
Old Elizabethans (promoted from Gloucester 3)Ross-on-Wye
St. Brendan's Old Boys
Spartans 
Tredworth (promoted from Gloucester 3)Westbury-on-Severn

Teams 2013–14
Aretians
Bredon Star
Bristol Aeroplane Co.
Broad Plain (relegated from Gloucester 1)Cheltenham Civil Service
Cotham Park
Old Cryptians (promoted from Gloucester 3)Ross-on-Wye
Spartans 
St. Brendands Old Boys
Westbury-on-Severn (promoted from Gloucester 3)Teams 2012–13
Aretians
Ashley Down Old Boys
Bream
Bredon Star
Bristol Aeroplane Co.
Cainscross
Cheltenham Civil Service
Cotham Park
Gloucester All Blues
Ross On Wye
Spartans 
St Brendan's Old Boys

Teams 2011-12
Aretians (relegated from Gloucester 1)Bristol Aeroplane Co.
Broad Plain
Cheltenham Civil Service (relegated from Gloucester 1)Chipping Sodbury 
Cotham Park (relegated from Gloucester 1)'''
Gloucester All Blues
Old Cryptians
Old Elizabethans
St. Brendon's Old Boys
Tetbury (withdrawn)
Westbury-on-Severn

Teams 2010-11
Bristol Aeroplane Co.
Cheltenham Saracens RFC
Chipping Sodbury
Greyhound RFC
Old Cryptians
Old Elizabethans
Newent
St. Brendon's Old Boys
Smiths 
Tetbury
Tredworth
Westbury-on-Severn

Teams 2009–10
Bristol Aeroplane Co.
Cainscross
Cheltenham Saracens RFC
Cotham Park
Greyhound
Kingswood
Old Elizabethans
St. Brendan's Old Boys
Tetbury
Tredworth
Westbury-on-Severn

Teams 2008–09
Bream
Bristol Aeroplane Co.
Cainscross
Cheltenham Saracens RFC
Greyhound
Kingswood
Old Cryptians
Old Elizabethans
Tetbury
Tredworth
Westbury-on-Severn

Teams 2007–08
Ashley Down Old Boys
Bristol Aeroplane Co.
Cainscross
Cheltenham Civil Service
Cheltenham Saracens RFC
Kingswood
Old Cryptians
Old Elizabethans
Smiths 
Tetbury
Westbury-on-Severn

Teams 2006–07
Ashley Down Old Boys
Bristol Aeroplane Co.
Cheltenham Saracens RFC
Cotham Park
Dursley
Ross-on-Wye
Kingswood
Old Elizabethans
Tetbury
Tredworth
Westbury-on-Severn

Teams 2005–06
Ashley Down Old Boys
Bristol Aeroplane Co.
Brockworth
Cheltenham Saracens RFC
Dursley
Hartpury College
Hucclecote
Old Cryptians
Old Elizabethans
Smiths

Teams 2004–05
Bream
Brockworth
Cheltenham Civil Service
Cheltenham Saracens RFC
Cotham Park
Dursley
Gloucester Civil Service
Hucclecote
Kingswood
Old Elizabethans

Teams 2003–04
Bream
Cheltenham Civil Service
Dursley
Minchinhampton
Old Colstonians
Old Cryptians
Old Elizabethans
Smiths 
Westbury-on-Severn

Teams 2002–03
Cheltenham Saracens RFC
Kingswood
Minchinhampton
Old Cryptians
Old Elizabethans
Ross-on-Wye
Smiths 
Westbury-on-Severn
Widden Old Boys

Teams 2001–02
Bishopston
Bristol Aeroplane Co.
Cainscross
Dursley
Kingswood
Old Elizabethans
Painswick
Smiths 
Southmead
Tewkesbury

Original teams
When league rugby began in 1987 this division (then a single division known as Gloucestershire 2) contained the following teams:

Ashley Down Old Boys
Barton Hill
Brockworth
Caincross
Cheltenham Civil Service
Cheltenham Saracens
Cotham Park
Dursley
North Bristol 
Old Cryptians
Saintbridge Former Pupils

Gloucester 2 honours

Gloucestershire 2 (1987–1991)

Originally as single division known as Gloucestershire 2, it was a tier 10 league with promotion to Gloucestershire 1 and relegation to Gloucestershire 3.

Gloucester 2 (1991–1993)

Gloucestershire 2 was shorted to Gloucester 2 for the 1991–92 season onward.  It remained a tier 10 league with promotion to Gloucester 1 and relegation to Gloucester 3.

Gloucester 2 (1993–1996)

The creation of National League 5 South for the 1993–94 season meant that Gloucester 2 dropped to become a tier 11 league.  Promotion continued to Gloucester 1 and relegation to Gloucester 3.

Gloucester 2 (1996–2000)

The cancellation of National League 5 South at the end of the 1995–96 season meant that Gloucester 2 reverted to being a tier 10 league.  Promotion continued to Gloucester 1 and relegation to Gloucester 3.

Gloucester 2 (2000–2009)

Gloucester 2 remained a tier 10 league despite the cancellation of Gloucestershire/Somerset at the end of the 1999–00 season.  Promotion continued to Gloucester 1 and relegation to Gloucester 3.  Between 2007 and 2009 Gloucester 2 was sponsored by High Bridge Jewellers.

Gloucester 2 (2009–2017)

Despite widespread restructuring by the RFU at the end of the 2008–09 season, Gloucester 2 remained a tier 10 league, with promotion continuing to Gloucester 1 and relegation to Gloucester 3.

Gloucester 2 North / South (2018–present)

For the 2018–19 season Gloucester 2 was split into two regional tier 10 leagues - Gloucester 2 North and Gloucester 2 South.  Promotion continued to Gloucester 1 and there was no longer any relegation due to the cancellation of Gloucester 3.  The league was now sponsored by Wadworth 6x.

Promotion play-offs
Since the 2018–19 season there has been a play-off between the runners-up of the Gloucester 2 North and Gloucester 2 South for the third and final promotion place to Gloucester 1. The team with the superior league record has home advantage in the tie.  At the end of the 2019–20 season Gloucester 2 North teams have been the most successful with one wins to the Gloucester 2 South teams zero; and the home team has won promotion on one occasions compared to the away teams zero.

Number of league titles

Bream (3)
Ashley Down Old Boys (2)
Brockworth (2)
Cheltenham Saracens (2)
Chipping Sodbury (2)
Old Colstonians (2)
St. Brendan's Old Boys (2)
Tewkesbury (2)
Bishopston (1)
Cheltenham Civil Service (1)
Dursley (1)
Gloucester Old Boys (1)
Hartpury College (1)
Hucclecote Old Boys (1)
Kingswood (1)
North Bristol (1)
Old Centralians (1)
Old Cryptians (1)
Ross-on-Wye (1)
Southmead (1)
Spartans (1)
Stow-on-the-Wold (1)
Thornbury (1)
Tredworth (1)
Westbury-on-Severn (1)

See also
 South West Division RFU
 Gloucestershire RFU
 English rugby union system
 Rugby union in England

Notes

References

G
Rugby union in Gloucestershire